Tinea svenssoni is a moth of the family Tineidae. It is found in northern Europe (Norway, Sweden, Finland, the Baltic region), Russia, as well as North America where has been recorded from Québec.

The forewings are uniform golden brown with a black spot in the distal third and a translucent bare patch near the costa at the base. Difficult to distinguish from Tinea pellionella , Tinea columbariella and Tinea dubiella  but the genitalia are diagnostic.

The larvae live in bird nests, typically in the nests of cavity-nesting species, such as tits and owls.

References

Gaedike,R. 2019  Tineidae II : Myrmecozelinae, Perissomasticinae, Tineinae, Hieroxestinae, Teichobiinae and Stathmopolitinae Microlepidoptera of Europe, vol. 9. Leiden : Brill, [2019] 
Petersen, G., 1957: Die Genitalien der paläarktischen Tineiden (Lepidoptera: Tineidae). Beiträge zur Entomologie 7 (1/2): 55–176.

External links
Swedish moths
Lepiforum de

Moths described in 1965
Tineinae
Moths of Europe
Moths of North America